The Société Nationale des Chemins de Fer Luxembourgeois (Luxembourg National Railway Company, abbreviated CFL) is the national railway company of Luxembourg. In 2013, it carried approximately 25 million passengers and 804 million tonnes of goods. The company employs 3,090 people, making CFL the country's seventh-largest corporate employer.

Luxembourg borders Belgium, France and Germany. Correspondingly, there are cross-border services into these countries. Some are wholly run by CFL, whereas others are run by SNCF, NMBS/SNCB and DB. CFL passenger trains cover most of the network.

CFL operates most of its passenger trains using EMUs and electric locomotives with push-pull stock. The company also has a fleet of diesel locomotives for hauling freight trains and for general shunting purposes.

Luxembourg is a member of the International Union of Railways (UIC). The UIC Country Code for Luxembourg is 82.

History
CFL is the result of a nationalisation of private railway companies in 1946.
 History of rail transport in Luxembourg

CFL operations and services

Passenger train routes

CFL advertises its passenger network as made up of seven lines:

Line 10 Luxembourg – Troisvierges-Frontière – Liège (Belgium), Kautenbach – Wiltz and Ettelbrück – Diekirch
Line 30 Luxembourg – Wasserbillig-Frontière – Trier (Germany)
Line 50 Luxembourg – Kleinbettingen-Frontière – Brussels (Belgium)
Line 60 Luxembourg – Esch-sur-Alzette – Rodange, Bettembourg – Volmerange-les-Mines (France), Noetzange – Rumelange and Esch-sur-Alzette – Audun-le-Tiche (France)
Line 70 Luxembourg – Rodange – Athus (Belgium), Rodange – Longwy (France)
Line 90 Luxembourg – Thionville (France) – Metz (France) – Nancy (France)

Internally it uses a different system with more sub divisions:

 Ligne 1 Luxembourg – Troisvierges-Frontière, 1a Ettelbruck – Diekirch, 1b Kautenbach – Wiltz
 Ligne 2a Kleinbettingen – Steinfort, 2b Ettelbruck – Bissen
 Ligne 3 Luxembourg – Wasserbillig-Frontière via Sandweiler-Contern
 Ligne 4 Luxembourg – Berchem – Oetrange, 4a Luxembourg - Alzingen
 Ligne 5 Luxembourg – Kleinbettingen-Frontière
 Ligne 6 Luxembourg – Bettembourg-Frontière, 6a Bettembourg – Esch/Alzette, 6b Bettembourg – Dudelange-Usines (Volmerange), 6c Noertzange – Rumelange, 6d Tétange – Langengrund, 6e Esch-sur-Alzette – Audun-le-Tiche, 6f Esch-sur-Alzette – Pétange, 6g Pétange – Rodange-Frontière (Aubange), 6h Pétange – Rodange-Frontière (Mont St. Martin), 6j Pétange – Rodange-Frontière (Athus), 6k Brucherberg – Scheuerbusch
 Ligne 7 Luxembourg – Pétange

Rail links to adjacent countries
All neighbouring railways use the same gauge but differing electrification types, listed below:
 Belgium  –   3 kV DC
 France  –  25 kV AC
 Germany  –  15 kV AC

Ridership
Passenger ridership carried on CFL-trains for each fiscal year (x 1000).

1938: 9,505
1950: 10,607
1960: 10,643
1970: 12,531
1980: 14,053
1990: 12,692
2000: 12,985
2006: 14,793
2007: 16,442
2008: 17,676
2009: 17,039
2010: 17,996
2011: 18,200
2012: 19,834
2013: 20,714
2014: 21,503
2015: 22,496
2016: 22,459
2017: 22,930
2018: 23,331
2019: 25,016

Passenger kilometers on CFL-trains for each fiscal year (x 1,000,000).

1938: 215
1950: 227
1960: 230
1970: 256
1980: 302
1990: 261
2000: 332
2006: 298
2007: 233
2008: 345
2009: 333
2010: 347
2011: 349
2012: 373
2013: 385
2014: 409
2015: 418
2016: 417
2017: 438
2018: 443
2019: 463

Rolling stock

CFL owns a relatively modern fleet of passenger trains, with a majority of double-decker trains. Nearly all routes are operated with electric trains.
 CFL locomotives and rolling stock

Projects
In 2019, doubling of track between Luxembourg railway station and Sandweiler-Contern at a cost of €462 million was completed, following an original planned 2013 opening. A new, more direct, line between Luxembourg and Bettembourg is due to open in 2024.

See also
 CFL Cargo Denmark
 Trams in Luxembourg
 Transport in Luxembourg

Footnotes

External links

  CFL official website
  2006 Annual Report
 Collection of Google Earth locations of CFL stations (Requires Google Earth software) from the Google Earth Community forum.

Companies
 01
Government-owned companies of Luxembourg
Companies based in Luxembourg City
Railway companies established in 1946
1946 establishments in Europe
1946 in Luxembourg